Sea Devils is a 1937 American film directed by Benjamin Stoloff. Among the American "preparedness films" of the mid-1930s devoted to enhancing the image of the Army (Flirtation Walk), the Navy (Here Comes the Navy) and the Marines (The Singing Marine, Devil Dogs of the Air), this entry focuses equivalent approving attention on the work of the U.S. Coast Guard.

Premise
A Coast Guard Chief Petty Officer's personality conflict with his younger counterpart gets physical when the seaman casts his eye on the Chief's librarian daughter, among iceberg destruction missions, dramatic boat rescues, and fistfights.

Cast 
 Victor McLaglen as CPO William Malone
 Preston Foster as Michael O'Shea
 Ida Lupino as Doris Malone
 Donald Woods as Steve Webb
 Helen Flint as Sadie Bennett
 Gordon Jones as Puggy
 Pierre Watkin as USCGC Taroe commander
 Murray Alper as Seaman Brown
 Billy Gilbert as Billy (policeman)
Unbilled players include Lane Chandler, George Irving, Dwight Frye Charles Lane and Brad Slaven .

Production
The film was to be directed by James Flood, but he left the project shortly before shooting after a disagreement with producer Small.

Reception
The film was popular and made a profit of $155,000.

References

External links 

 
 
 
 

1937 films
Films directed by Benjamin Stoloff
RKO Pictures films
American black-and-white films
Films about the United States Coast Guard
Films produced by Edward Small
Films scored by Roy Webb
Films scored by Nathaniel Shilkret
American action films
1930s action films
1930s English-language films
1930s American films